Schizothorax heteri is a species of ray-finned fish in the genus Schizothorax. It is found in the Irrawaddy River drainage in China.

References 

Schizothorax
Fish described in 2013